Třebařov is a municipality and village in Svitavy District in the Pardubice Region of the Czech Republic. It has about 900 inhabitants.

Notable people
Hans Knirsch (1877–1933), Austro-German politician
Henry Kučera (1925–2010), linguist and pioneer of computer linguistics

References

Villages in Svitavy District